Agaricus langei is a species of fungus in the genus Agaricus.

See also
List of Agaricus species

References

External links

langei
Fungi described in 1950
Fungi of Europe
Edible fungi